A thermodynamic free entropy is an entropic thermodynamic potential analogous to the free energy. Also known as a Massieu, Planck, or Massieu–Planck potentials (or functions), or (rarely) free information. In statistical mechanics, free entropies frequently appear as the logarithm of a partition function. The Onsager reciprocal relations in particular, are developed in terms of entropic potentials. In mathematics, free entropy means something quite different: it is a generalization of entropy defined in the subject of free probability.

A free entropy is generated by a Legendre transformation of the entropy. The different potentials correspond to different constraints to which the system may be subjected.

Examples

The most common examples are:

where

 is entropy
 is the Massieu potential
 is the Planck potential
 is internal energy

 is temperature
 is pressure
 is volume
 is Helmholtz free energy

 is Gibbs free energy
 is number of particles (or number of moles) composing the i-th chemical component
 is the chemical potential of the i-th chemical component
 is the total number of components
 is the th components.

Note that the use of the terms "Massieu" and "Planck" for explicit Massieu-Planck potentials are somewhat obscure and ambiguous. In particular "Planck potential" has alternative meanings. (Note that Gibbs used  to denote the free energy.) Free entropies where invented by French engineer François Massieu in 1869, and actually predate Gibbs's free energy (1875).

Dependence of the potentials on the natural variables

Entropy

By the definition of a total differential,

From the equations of state,

The differentials in the above equation are all of extensive variables, so they may be integrated to yield

Massieu potential / Helmholtz free entropy

The above differentials are not all of extensive variables, so the equation may not be directly integrated. From  we see that

If reciprocal variables are not desired,

Planck potential / Gibbs free entropy

The above differentials are not all of extensive variables, so the equation may not be directly integrated. From  we see that

If reciprocal variables are not desired,

References

Bibliography

Thermodynamic entropy